Donia Massoud (born 2 May 1979) is an Egyptian actress and singer.

Biography
Massoud was born and raised in Alexandria. At the age of 19, she moved to Cairo to the chagrin of her parents. Massoud discovered the stage and theater in Cairo, becoming a singer and actress.

During the early 2000s, Massoud spent three years travelling through Egypt collecting folk tales and music. She made recordings of traditional songs and gained access to village weddings and festivals. She was surprised that much of the music dealt with the experiences of women, characterizing many songs as almost bawdy. Massoud released a limited-run album in 2009, Mahatet Masr, and her most popular song "Betnadeeny Tany Leeh" questions why an old boyfriend is calling her since she found a new lover. She toured performing the music in Africa, Europe, and Asia, playing traditional instruments as well as singing.

In addition to her music, Massoud joined the theater group Al-Warsha. She considers music to be a similar art form to the dramatic arts. Her stage presence has been compared to that of Soad Hosny. Massoud has starred in several films and television series in Egypt and Sweden, in both Arabic and English. Her roles include the films Galteny Mogremen (2006), In the Heliopolis Flat (2007) and Genenet al asmak (2008).

In 2015, Massoud drew controversy for a tattoo on her back that read, "My heart’s feud is with God."

Filmography
Films
 2002 : Khalli Eldemagh Sahi
 2006 : Galteny Mogremen 
 2007 : In the Heliopolis Flat 
 2008 : Genenet al asmak 
 2011 : Blue Dive

Television
 2005 : Alb Habiba
 2007 : Hanan w Haneen
 2008 : Eleiada
 2008 : Sharif we Nos
 2009 : Majnoun Laila
 2010 : Ahl Cairo 
 2011 : Matt Nam Sabboba Massreya

References

External links
Donia Massoud at the Internet Movie Database
Official website

1979 births
Living people
21st-century Egyptian actresses
Egyptian film actresses
Egyptian television actresses
Egyptian stage actresses
21st-century Egyptian women singers
People from Alexandria